Joculator melania is a species of minute sea snail, a marine gastropod mollusc in the family Cerithiopsidae. The species was described by Laseron in 1956.

References

Gastropods described in 1956
melania